This is a list containing the Billboard Hot Latin Tracks number-ones of 1999.

See also
Billboard Hot Latin Tracks

References

1999 record charts
Lists of Billboard Hot Latin Songs number-one songs
1999 in Latin music